The 2019 Men's FIH Pro League was the first season of the Pro League, the premier men's field hockey national team league series. The tournament started in January 2019 and finished in June 2019 in Amstelveen, Netherlands.

Australia defeated Belgium 3–2 in the final to win the first FIH Pro League title.

The competition also served as a qualifier for the 2020 Summer Olympics with the four best teams qualifying for the FIH Olympic Qualifiers taking place in October and November 2019.

Qualification
Nine teams competed in a round-robin tournament with home and away matches, played from January to June, with the top four teams advancing to the final at the Wagener Stadium in Amstelveen, Netherlands. In July 2017, Hockey India decided to withdraw the men's national team from the competition as they estimated the chances of qualifying for the Summer Olympics to be higher when participating in the Hockey Series. Hockey India also cited lack of clarity in the ranking system. The International Hockey Federation subsequently invited Spain instead. Pakistan was suspended on 23 January 2019 after they could not play their first three games.

 (1)
 (2)
 (3)
 (4)
 (6)
 (7)
 (8)
 (9)
 (12)

Results

Standings

Fixtures
All times are local.

Due to heavy rain and thunder the match was cancelled and considered a 0–0 draw.

Grand Final

Semi-finals

Third place game

Final

Statistics

Final standings

Awards

Goalscorers

See also
2019 Women's FIH Pro League
2018–19 Men's Hockey Series

Notes

References

External links
Official website

FIH Pro League
Men
FIH Pro League